Sergio De Gregorio (born 16 September 1960 in Naples) is an Italian politician and journalist.

Biography
De Gregorio began his career as a journalist at the age of 17, in 1977, collaborating until 1980 with the Chronicle Editorial of Naples of Paese Sera. Subsequently he worked also for radio and television.

In December 1996 he became the first director of L'Avanti! by Valter Lavitola (not to be confused with the historic socialist newspaper Avanti!). He remained the director of the newspaper until 2005.

In 2000, he founded the "Italians in the World" association with the aim of spreading and promoting the image of Italy and Italians in the world, including through its own satellite television channel, Italians in the World Channel.

De Gregorio was also a parliamentary assistant at the European Parliament until 2004. In 2005, after the failure of an agreement with Forza Italia, he ran for regional elections in Campania on the list of Gianfranco Rotondi, the Christian Democracy for the Autonomies.

In 2005, Italians in the World became a political movement and reached an agreement with the Italy of Values for the 2006 general election. In April 2006 De Gregorio was elected to the Senate of the Republic on the Italy of Values list.

On 7 June he was elected President of the Defense Commission thanks to an agreement with the House of Freedoms reached directly with the mediation of the Senate leader of Forza Italia, Renato Schifani, in contrast to the candidate of the Union, the ex-partisan Lidia Menapace. The vote of the same De Gregorio was crucial, who by voting himself with the senators of the House of Freedoms had put in crisis the majority of the Union.

On 25 September 2006, after further controversy following his abstention during the vote of an indult order, he announced his definitive exit from IdV and from the centre-left majority, subsequently voting against the Prodi II government's confidence during the crisis of February 2007.

In September 2007 De Gregorio officially returned to the centre-right side, signing a federative pact between his movement and Forza Italia. On 24 January 2008 he voted the distrust against the Prodi II government, contributing to its fall. In 2008, De Gregorio is elected Senator of the Republic on The People of Freedom list.

Member of the Defense Commission and also president of the Italian Parliamentary Delegation to the Parliamentary Assembly of NATO, a post from which he will self-suspend on 14 April 2012 in reference to the investigation that sees him investigated on the misappropriation of 20 million euros of funding to the newspaper Avanti!.

Judicial proceedings
Since June 2007 he has been under investigation by the Naples Anti-Mafia Prosecutor for the crimes of laundering and abetting the Camorra. On 25 February 2008 he was entered in the register of suspects of the Public Prosecutor of Rome for the crime of corruption. Both investigations were born in Campania, where the Guardia di Finanza discovered a series of checks signed or filmed by De Gregorio.

On 8 April 2008 he was entered in the register of suspects of the Reggio Calabria district anti-mafia prosecutor's office for external competition in association with mafia-type crimes aimed at recycling. On 8 May 2009, the investigating judge of Reggio Calabria, Arena, issued the decree concerning the case.

On 15 February 2012, De Gregorio was investigated for fraud and false invoicing within the scope of the investigation into loans to the daily newspaper L'Avanti! together with the current director Valter Lavitola. According to the indictment, Lavitola "as the de facto owner and co-director of the International Press" company that manages the newspaper, and De Gregorio "as effective shareholder since 1997 and co-director of the same company, have shown that the publisher of the L'Avanti!, possessed the legal requirements to obtain the contributions provided for by the law for publishing: a total of 23 million and 200 thousand euros received from 1997 to 2009 including false assumptions. On 16 April 2012 a precautionary custody order was issued under house arrest against him by the prosecutor's office of the Republic of Naples, again with reference to the misappropriation of 20 million euros in loans to the daily newspaper L'Avanti!.

De Gregorio was also accused of having been bribed with 3 million euros for his passage to the centre-right in 2007. For this reason, in February 2013, Silvio Berlusconi was investigated for concussion. On 11 March 2013, speaking with journalists about his involvement in the investigation into the alleged sale of the senators, De Gregorio publicly admitted that he took two million euros in black and committed a crime, therefore. On 9 May 2013, the Naples Public Prosecutor asked for Silvio Berlusconi's trial for the alleged sale of the senators. A similar request was made for former Senator Sergio De Gregorio and the former director of L'Avanti! Valter Lavitola. Berlusconi and Lavitola were sentenced on 8 July 2015 to 3 years in prison.

References

1960 births
Living people
Politicians from Naples
21st-century Italian politicians
Italian Socialist Party politicians
Forza Italia politicians
Christian Democracy for the Autonomies politicians
Italy of Values politicians
The People of Freedom politicians